Emarat (also Romanized as ‘Emārat; also known as ‘Emāratlū) is a village in Angut-e Gharbi Rural District, Anguti District, Germi County, Ardabil Province, Iran. At the 2006 census, its population was 223, in 49 families.

References 

Towns and villages in Germi County